NRJ is a French radio station.

NRJ may also refer to:

NRJ Group, a French multimedia group; owner of NRJ radio
NRJ (Belgium)
NRJ (Lebanon)
NRJ (Quebec), Canada; now known as Énergie
NRJ Russia
NRJ 12, a French TV channel
NRJ Music Award
Northern Rhodesia Journal, a 1950-1965 government-published history journal
Naval Air Station Sanford (IATA code 1942–1969)

See also 
NRG (disambiguation)
Energy (disambiguation)